The Stringbike is a bicycle that uses a rope and pulley drive system instead of a traditional bicycle chain and sprockets. It uses two Dyneema ropes attached to pulleys attached to swinging lever and cam mechanisms, one on each side of the bike. These mechanisms replace the round sprockets found on chain-driven bikes. Unlike some traditional 10-speed gears using a derailleur, there is no slippage when changing gear ratios. The Stringbike uses a 19 gear ratio system with no duplicates and a total gear range of 3.5 to 1. The transmission ratio can be changed with a shifting knob located on the right-side handle grip. Gear ratios can be changed even when the bicycle is almost stationary.

Hungarian designers from the manufacturing company Stringbike Kft., unveiled the bicycle in 2010 in Padova, Italy.

Models
There are 2 main types of stringbikes. Stringbikes with carbon frame, and stringbikes with curved aluminum frame.

Stringbike models with aluminum frame:
 A line Classic
 A line Marine
 A line Dragon
 S line Stringie

Limited series stringbike models with aluminum frame:
 D signers's Nanushka
 D signers's Happarel
 D signers's Spring Fashion
 D signers's Black Pearl

Stringbike models with carbon frame:
 E line RAAM (same model was used in the Race Across America 2012 - achieving 14th position overall)
 E line Hurricane
 E line Black Storm

Limited series stringbike models with carbon frame:
 D signers's Alligator

References

External links
 Website

Cycle types